Jimmy Starr (3 February 1904 – August 13, 1990) was an American screenwriter and columnist.

Star began his career in Hollywood at 15 as an office boy at MGM. In 1923, Starr was hired as motion-picture editor of the now defunct Los Angeles Evening Post-Record, to which he contributed the “Cinematters” column through 1930. Starr worked as a screenwriter in Hollywood during the 1930s. From the 1940s he worked as a film writer and columnist, providing reviews and insights into the film world, and made occasional appearances in cameo roles in film. His novel The Corpse Came C.O.D. was made into a 1947 film.

After retirement from the Hollywood scene, Starr moved to Phoenix, Arizona, where he worked for many years as Director of Advertising and Public Relations for Ramada Inn, which was then headquartered in Phoenix.

He gave many of his personal papers and photographs to Arizona State University in the 1970s.

References

Further reading
 "Jimmy Starr", Contemporary Authors, Volume 132. Gale Research, 1991. 
 "Jimmy Starr", Biography Index, Volume 27. H. W. Wilson Co., 2002.
 A Jimmy Starr Omnibus (Ramble House, 2011).

External links

1904 births
1990 deaths
American male screenwriters
20th-century American male writers
Screenwriters from Texas
20th-century American screenwriters